Guthormr sindri (or Gothormr sindri) is a 10th-century Norwegian skald. He was a court-poet of king Haraldr Fairhair (hárfagri) and his sons, Hálfdan the Black (svarti) and Hákon the Good (góði), for whom he composed the Hákonardrápa.

Snorri Sturluson relates how Guthormr intervened between Haraldr and Hálfdan and succeeded in putting an end to their conflict:

The Hákonardrápa is Guthormr's only known work, since the poems about Haraldr Fairhair and Hálfdan the Black mentioned by Snorri were lost. Six stanzas and two half stanzas of the Hákonardrápa are preserved in Snorri's Hákonar saga góða and in Óláfs saga Tryggvasonar en mesta. The poem recounts the battles won by Hákon the Good against the Danes (1-2), his raids in Zealand, Scania and Götaland (3-4) and his victories over the sons of his brother Eric Bloodaxe (6-8).

Notes

External links
 Guthormr's Hákonardrápa in the original language

Norwegian male poets
10th-century Norwegian poets